Love Songs contains the Carpenters' love ballads, from their first big hit, "(They Long to Be) Close to You" to their later songs, like "Make Believe It's Your First Time" and "Where Do I Go from Here?". It remained on the Billboard charts for over six months and was certified Gold.

Track listings
"I Need to Be in Love" — from the album A Kind of Hush
"Solitaire" — from the album Horizon
"We've Only Just Begun" — from the album Close to You
"This Masquerade" — from the album Now & Then
"You're the One" — from the album Lovelines
"Superstar" — from the album Carpenters
"Rainy Days and Mondays" — from the album Carpenters
"Top of the World" — from the album A Song for You
"Make Believe It's Your First Time" — from the album Voice of the Heart
"I Just Fall in Love Again" — from the album Passage
"(They Long to Be) Close to You" — from the album Close to You
"For All We Know" — from the album Carpenters
"Where Do I Go from Here?" — from the album Lovelines
"Only Yesterday" — from the album Horizon
"All You Get from Love Is a Love Song" — from the album Passage
"When I Fall in Love" — from the album Lovelines
"Hurting Each Other" — from the album A Song for You
"I Won't Last a Day Without You" — from the album A Song for You
"A Song for You" — from the album A Song for You
"Goodbye to Love" — from the album A Song for You

References

The Carpenters compilation albums
1997 compilation albums
A&M Records compilation albums